Zachkan (also Romanized as Zāchkān; also known as Zaikān, Zājkān, Zāj Kand, Zāj Kandī, Z̄āker, and Zaykan) is a village in Chavarzaq Rural District, Chavarzaq District, Tarom County, Zanjan Province, Iran. At the 2006 census, its population was 195, in 56 families.

References 

Populated places in Tarom County